Zhang Rui (born 25 January 1979) is a table tennis player from Liaoning, China. She won a silver medal at the 2006 Asian Games for Hong Kong in the doubles competition.

References

External links
 ITTF DATABASE

Living people
1979 births
Hong Kong female table tennis players
Table tennis players at the 2010 Asian Games
Table tennis players at the 2006 Asian Games
Asian Games medalists in table tennis
Asian Games silver medalists for Hong Kong
Medalists at the 2006 Asian Games
Table tennis players from Shenyang
21st-century Hong Kong women